Vladimir Petrovich Kosogov (born 26 January 1952) is a Russian professional football coach and a former player. In 2010, he managed FC Pskov-747 Pskov.

External links
 

1952 births
Living people
Soviet footballers
Russian football managers
Association football goalkeepers
FC SKA-Khabarovsk players
FC Spartak Ryazan players
FC Zvezda Irkutsk players
FC Zvezda Perm players
FC Pskov-2000 managers
FC Amur Blagoveshchensk players